The Ésera, is a tributary of the Cinca in the High Aragon. It is part of the valley of the Ebro and its drainage basin. Its etymology is Celtic and it is cognate with several European rivers: Isar, Jizera, Isère, Isel, IJssel, and Eisack.

References

Ebro basin